La Chaîne parlementaire (French for The Parliamentary Channel) is a French television network created, along with its sister station Public Sénat, by law on 30 December 1999. It films and broadcasts live and recorded debates twenty-four hours a day, including committee hearings, questions to the government, and discussions concerning parliamentary debates and government policy.  There are programs that focus on different levels of government; some programs are about Europe, others about local government.  Linked to Public Sénat from its inception, the two channels share content.  The Public Sénat chain also broadcasts a nightly news analysis program and funds and broadcasts documentaries.

Broadcasting history

It started by broadcasting twice a week, Tuesday and Wednesday, in the afternoons on France 3. On 8 February 2000, the channel started broadcasting activity from the Senate of France. On 31 March 2005, the channel obtained its own TNT frequency.

High-definition (HD) broadcasting of the combined LCP/Public Sénat channel started on 1 July 2015 via satellite in the CanalSat mux as an upscaled HD feed. In January 2017 the HD feed was changed from upscaled into native HD (1920x1080).

See also 
 Legislative broadcaster

External links 
 Website of the National Assembly of France channel (LCP)
 Website of the Senate of France channel (Public Sénat)

References 

French-language television stations
Legislature broadcasters
Television channels and stations established in 1999
Television stations in France
1999 establishments in France